Pierre Souziff (10 January 1886 – 12 June 1943) was a French architect. His work was part of the architecture event in the art competition at the 1928 Summer Olympics.

References

External links
  

1886 births
1943 deaths
20th-century French architects
Olympic competitors in art competitions